Lorenzo Guivelondo Teves (Valencia, Negros Oriental, April 29, 1918 – Dumaguete, October 17, 1996) was a Philippine politician who served in various positions in the Philippine Government.  Teves hailed from the Province of Negros Oriental, where he took his college and law degrees from Silliman University. He was later on elected as representative of the 1st District of the province and served in that capacity from 1954 to 1965 in the 3rd, 4th and 5th Congresses of the Philippines. In 1967 he was elected as a senator for the 6th Congress and 7th Congress. However, his term was cut short when President Ferdinand Marcos declared Martial Law in 1972. In 1978, he was appointed by President Marcos as governor of Negros Oriental, and in 1979, was elected for that same position. He continued to hold the office until 1987. A sports complex and a street in his hometown of Dumaguete was later named after Lorenzo Teves after his death. He is succeeded by eight children from his first marriage and three children from his second marriage.

''Civic Affairs

Teves was the area commander for Visayas 1981-1985 of the Knights of Rizal. He was also awarded the Hall of Fame Boys Scouts of the Philippines Negros Oriental-Siquijor Council.

Footnotes

External links
House of Representatives. Official website
Senate of the Philippines. Official website

1918 births
1996 deaths
Senators of the 7th Congress of the Philippines
Senators of the 6th Congress of the Philippines
Governors of Negros Oriental
Silliman University alumni
Members of the House of Representatives of the Philippines from Negros Oriental
People from Negros Oriental
Nacionalista Party politicians